Prionapteryx amathusia is a moth in the family Crambidae. It was described by Graziano Bassi and Wolfram Mey in 2011. It is found in Namibia.

References

Ancylolomiini
Moths described in 2011